The Man I Love is a 1947 American film noir melodrama directed by Raoul Walsh, based on the novel Night Shift by Maritta M. Wolff, and starring Ida Lupino, Robert Alda and Bruce Bennett. The title is taken from the George and Ira Gershwin song "The Man I Love", which is prominently featured.

Plot
Homesick for her family in Los Angeles, lounge singer Petey Brown (Ida Lupino) decides to leave New York City to spend some time visiting her two sisters and brother on the West Coast. Shortly she lands a job at the nightclub of small-time-hood Nicky Toresca (Robert Alda) where her sister Sally (Andrea King) is employed.

While evading the sleazy Toresca's heavy-handed passes, Petey falls in love with down-and-out ex-jazz pianist, legendary San Thomas (Bruce Bennett), who has never recovered from an old divorce. Variously helping to smooth over or solve the problems of her sisters, brother and their next-door neighbor, the no-nonsense Petey must wait as San decides whether to start a new life with her or sign back on with a merchant steamer.

Cast

 Ida Lupino as Petey Brown
 Robert Alda as Nicky Toresca
 Andrea King as Sally Otis
 Martha Vickers as Virginia Brown
 Bruce Bennett as San Thomas
 Alan Hale as Riley 
 Dolores Moran as Gloria O'Connor
 John Ridgely as Roy Otis
 Don McGuire as Johnny O'Connor
 Warren Douglas as Joe Brown
 Craig Stevens as Bandleader
 Tony Romano as Bamboo Club singer
 William Edmunds as Uncle Tony 
 Jimmie Dodd as Jimmy

Production and reception
Warner Bros. purchased the rights to Maritta Wolff's novel Night Shift in 1942 for $25,000, with the original intention of casting Ann Sheridan and Humphrey Bogart in the film adaptation.  Working titles for the film were Night Shift and Why Was I Born?, the latter a 1929 song by Jerome Kern and Oscar Hammerstein II which featured in the movie. Production fell behind schedule because Lupino was suffering from exhaustion – she fainted during one scene with Robert Alda and had to be cut out of her tight-fitting dress – finishing 19 days late and $100,000 over budget.

Bosley Crowther, writing for The New York Times, considered the film's mood to be "both silly and depressing, not to mention dull".  Film critic Leonard Maltin gave it 3 stars out of 4.

The Man I Love later became Martin Scorsese's primary inspiration for his film New York, New York (1977).

References

External links
 
 
 
 

1947 films
1947 drama films
American drama films
American black-and-white films
1940s English-language films
Film noir
Films based on American novels
Films directed by Raoul Walsh
Films scored by Max Steiner
Films set in Los Angeles
Warner Bros. films
Melodrama films
1940s American films